Mary Ellen Beck Wohl was chief of the respiratory diseases division at Children's Hospital Boston (a teaching hospital of Harvard Medical School), and served as associate director of the general clinical research center until a few years before her death in November 2009. Since the 1960s, when she first joined the university, Wohl specialized in the respiratory diseases of children and was a leader in the field of clinical research on Cystic fibrosis. She developed a number of techniques to evaluate the function of the lungs in young children and is the author of many research papers in this field.

Early life and education
Mary Ellen Beck was born in Cleveland, Ohio, in 1932.  Her father, Claude Beck, was a surgeon and professor of cardiovascular surgery at Western Reserve University (later Case Western), and her mother Ellen Manning Beck was a surgical nurse.  As she was growing up medicine was often discussed in the family at the dinner table and both she and her younger sister trained as physicians.

In 1954, Beck graduated magna cum laude from Radcliffe College with a bachelor of arts degree. She had rebelled against the family interest in medicine as an undergraduate and studied history and literature, but she also took pre-medical courses and organic chemistry as part of a more general education. When she decided not to study for a Ph.D. in history she was well prepared to apply to medical school instead. After graduating from Radcliffe, she enrolled at the Columbia University College of Physicians and Surgeons.

Beck graduated with her doctor of medicine degree in 1958, and went on to an internship at Bellevue Hospital in New York City.

Career
In 1959 she became junior assistant resident in pediatrics at Babies' Hospital in New York City, and was made senior assistant resident two years later.

In 1962, she took up a research fellowship in physiology at the Harvard School of Public Health, partly to be near her husband Dr. Martin Wohl, who was completing a residency there. That same year, she joined Children's Hospital Boston as a fellow in medicine. Dr. Mary Ellen Beck Wohl has remained affiliated with the university and Children's Hospital since 1962, specializing in respiratory disease in children, especially asthma and cystic fibrosis, and lung growth and disease.

In 1980, Wohl was named chief of the division of respiratory diseases at Children's Hospital. Since 1985 she has run the cystic fibrosis center at the hospital and has trained 60 fellows in pediatric pulmonology in the program she founded and developed. In 2002 she retired from the position and was named division chief emerita. She remains associate director of the general clinical research center at Children's Hospital today.

Wohl is a member of the American Thoracic Society and the American Academy of Pediatrics and has served on committees for both societies.  She has also served on the editorial board of the American Review of Respiratory Diseases. She has held visiting professorships at universities in Colombia, Australia, and Taiwan, and is a highly regarded teacher, researcher, and clinician.

Wohl has served on a number of national and regional committees as well as the board of advisors at Harvard Medical School. From 1993 to 1996 she was a member of the faculty council overseeing the Promotions and Reappointments Committee addressing issues concerning women in medicine. Concerned that women today face challenges she never knew of, Wohl has stated that she is especially grateful for the opportunities she had early in her career. Beginning with modest ambitions to work alongside her husband and balance a fulfilling career with raising a family, Wohl eventually became a leader in the field of children's respiratory disease and the use of clinical trials in cystic fibrosis research. Born during the Great Depression and attending medical school in the 1950s, Wohl believes she "profited so much from not being visible for many years in the career I had chosen... I was able to progress at my own pace in a field I developed."

Awards
 Edwin L. Kendig Award from the American Academy of Pediatrics and the American Academy of Chest Physicians, 2002 (for outstanding achievements in pediatric pulmonology) 
 American Thoracic Society Lifetime Achievement Award, 2001
 Distinguished Alumna Award, 1986, Laurel School
 Her biography was included by the National Library of Medicine in a list of persons that have "Changed the Face of Medicine".

Significant papers
Wohl has over 60 papers in peer-reviewed scientific journals. The impact of these papers has been considerable: according to the Web of Science several have been cited in dozens, sometimes even hundreds, of other scientific publications.

 HJ. Fuchs et al. (Wohl, corresponding author), "Effect of Aerosolized Recombinant Human DNase on Exacerbations of Respiratory Symptoms and on Pulmonary Function in Patients with Cystic Fibrosis", New England Journal of Medicine, v.331, n.10, pp. 672–3 (Sept. 8 1994).

Further reading
 Wohl's papers are archived at Countway Library, Harvard Medical School.

References
 Dyer, D.; Feig, S.; Schalick, Walt O; editors, Transcripts of Interviews with Mary Ellen Wohl ... (medical history interviews, Harvard, 2001)

Notes

External links
Journal of Applied Psychology
Am. J. Respir. Crit.
Neuro-surgery on-line
Journal of Applied Physiology
Google Books

1932 births
Living people
American pulmonologists
Radcliffe College alumni
Columbia University Vagelos College of Physicians and Surgeons alumni
Harvard Medical School faculty